The Ucayali moist forests (NT0174) is an ecoregion in the western Amazon rainforest of Peru.

Geography

Location 
The Ucayali moist forest ecoregion is to the east of the Andes mountains in Peru.
It is bounded to the east by the Ucayali River, a major tributary of the Amazon River.
To the north it is bounded by the Marañón River.

In the extreme northwest the Ucayali moist forests transition into the Eastern Cordillera Real montane forests.
Across the Marañón River valley they transition into the Marañón dry forests, then along most of their western and southern boundary they transition into the Peruvian Yungas.
To the east they are separated from the Southwest Amazon moist forests by a belt of Iquitos várzea along the Ucayali River, and to the north they are separated from the Napo moist forests by a belt of Iquitos varzea along the Marañón River.

Terrain 
The sub-Andean terrain is generally flat, but is divided by the Cordillera Oriental, highlands that run along the length of the ecoregion. 
Many rivers and streams flow from the mountains to the west into the upper Amazon basin.

Climate 
At a sample location at  the Köppen climate classification is "Af": equatorial, fully humid.

Ecology 
The ecoregion is in the Neotropical realm, in the tropical and subtropical moist broadleaf forests biome.

Flora 
Forests are transitional between wet lowland rainforest to the east and premontane moist forests higher up.
The ecoregion has diverse flora, with many species of palm.
Tropical hardwood species include mahogany, tropical cedar and kapok.

Fauna 
188 species of mammals have been recorded.
There are over 600 species of birds.
There are also large populations of many species of invertebrates, amphibians and reptiles.

Endangered mammals include white-bellied spider monkey (Ateles belzebuth), Peruvian spider monkey (Ateles chamek), Rio Mayo titi (Callicebus oenanthe) and giant otter (Pteronura brasiliensis).
Endangered amphibians include Silverstone's poison frog (Ameerega silverstonei) and Johnson's horned treefrog (Hemiphractus johnsoni).

Status 
The World Wildlife Fund gives the ecoregion the status of "Vulnerable".
The Cordillera Azul National Park protects part of the ecoregion.

References

Bibliography 

 
 
 

Ecoregions of Peru
Neotropical tropical and subtropical moist broadleaf forests